Washington Heights is an  American docu-reality television series on MTV. The series debuted on January 9, 2013, and concluded on March 13, 2013.

Premise
The series follows the lives of nine primarily Dominican young adults who live in Washington Heights. Each one of them has their own individuality, and dreams they wish to pursue but they all have to face personal issues and obstacles along the way while living in the neighborhood that has brought them together like family.

Cast

 JP Johnathan Perez (a.k.a. Audubon)
 Reyna Saldana
 Frankie Reese
 Ludwin Federo
 Jimmy Caceres
 Rico Rasuk
 Fred Rasuk
 Taylor Howell
 Eliza Jefferson

Ratings
The show ratings were poor. The show premiered with 0.4 adults 18-49 rating and less than 756,000 viewers, which is significantly lower than the premiere of MTV's former programming The Inbetweeners.

References

External links

2010s American reality television series
2013 American television series debuts
2013 American television series endings
English-language television shows
MTV original programming
Television shows set in New York City